The Dove Award for Pop/Contemporary Album of the Year has been awarded since 1976, except for 1979. Years reflect the year in which the Dove Awards were presented, for works released in the previous year.

2020s
Dove Awards of 2022
For King & Country for What Are We Waiting For?
Dove Awards of 2021
We the Kingdom for Holy Water
Dove Awards of 2020
Tauren Wells for Citizen of Heaven

2010s
Dove Awards of 2019
Lauren Daigle for Look Up Child
Dove Awards of 2018
Tauren Wells for Hills and Valleys
Dove Awards of 2017
MercyMe for Lifer
Dove Awards of 2016
TobyMac for This is Not a Test
Dove Awards of 2015
for KING & COUNTRY for RUN WILD. LIVE FREE. LOVE STRONG.
Dove Awards of 2014
Mandisa for Overcomer
Dove Awards of 2013
TobyMac for Eye on It
Dove Awards of 2012
Laura Story for Blessings
Dove Awards of 2011
Chris August for No Far Away
Dove Awards of 2010
Jars of Clay for The Long Fall Back to Earth

2000s
Dove Awards of 2009
Third Day for Revelation
Dove Awards of 2008
Casting Crowns for The Altar and the Door
Dove Awards of 2007
Chris Tomlin for See the Morning
Dove Awards of 2006
Casting Crowns for Lifesong
Dove Awards of 2005
MercyMe for Undone
Dove Awards of 2004
Stacie Orrico for Stacie Orrico
Dove Awards of 2003
Nichole Nordeman for Woven & Spun
Dove Awards of 2002
Steven Curtis Chapman for Declaration
Dove Awards of 2001
Michael W. Smith for This Is Your Time
Dove Awards of 2000
Steven Curtis Chapman for Speechless

1990s
Dove Awards of 1999
Michael W. Smith for Live The Life
Dove Awards of 1998
Amy Grant for Behind The Eyes
Dove Awards of 1997
Steven Curtis Chapman for Signs Of Life
Dove Awards of 1996
Point of Grace for The Whole Truth
Dove Awards of 1995
Steven Curtis Chapman for Heaven in the Real World
Dove Awards of 1994
Michael English for Hope
Dove Awards of 1993
Steven Curtis Chapman for The Great Adventure
Dove Awards of 1992
Steven Curtis Chapman for For the Sake of the Call
Dove Awards of 1991
Michael W. Smith for Go West Young Man
Dove Awards of 1990
BeBe and CeCe Winans for Heaven

1980s
Dove Awards of 1989
Amy Grant for Lead Me On
Dove Awards of 1988
Wayne Watson for Watercolour Ponies
Dove Awards of 1987
Michael W. Smith for The Big Picture
Dove Awards of 1986
Russ Taff for Medals
Dove Awards of 1985
Amy Grant for Straight Ahead
Dove Awards of 1984
The Imperials for Side By Side
Dove Awards of 1983
Amy Grant for Age to Age
Dove Awards of 1982
The Imperials for Priority
Dove Awards of 1981
The Imperials for One More Song For You
Dove Awards of 1980
Dallas Holm and Praise for All That Matters

1970s
Dove Awards of 1978
Cruse Family for Transformation
Dove Awards of 1977
Reba Rambo-McGuire for Lady
Dove Awards of 1976
The Imperials for No Shortage

References

External links
http://www.doveawards.com/ Dove Awards website

GMA Dove Awards
Album awards